Minnesota State Highway 117 (MN 117) is a short  highway in west central Minnesota, which runs from Roberts County Road 19 at the South Dakota state line and continues east to its eastern terminus at its intersection with MN 27 near Wheaton. MN 117 passes through Lake Valley Township.

Route description
Highway 117 serves as a short east–west connector route between Lake Traverse at the Minnesota / South Dakota state line and Minnesota State Highway 27.

The route is legally defined as Route 191 in the Minnesota Statutes. It is not marked with this number.

History
Highway 117 was authorized in 1933.

The route was paved by 1942.

Major intersections

References

117
Transportation in Traverse County, Minnesota